The Yvonne River is a tributary of Surprise Lake (Roy River), flowing into the Municipality of Eeyou Istchee James Bay (municipality),
Jamésie, in the administrative region of Nord-du-Québec, Quebec, Canada.
 
The Yvonne River successively crosses the townships of Marceau, Bressani and Langloiserie. Forestry is the main activity economic sector; recreational tourism activities, second.

The Yvonne River Valley is served by the R1099 forest road (North-South direction) which passes on the west side and by some roads secondary forest managed mainly for logging.
 
The surface of the Yvonne River is usually frozen from early November to mid-May, however safe ice circulation is usually from mid-November to mid-April.

Geography

Toponymy 
At various times in history, this territory has been occupied by the Attikameks, the Algonquin and the Cree. The term "Yvonne" constitutes a name of French origin.

The toponym "Yvonne River" was formalized on July 4, 1972 at the Commission de toponymie du Québec.

Notes and references

See also 

Rivers of Nord-du-Québec
Jamésie
Nottaway River drainage basin